Kevin Thomas Steel (born August 4, 1991) is an American swimmer who specializes in breaststroke events.

References

External links
  Kevin Steel – University of Arizona athlete profile at ArizonaWildcats.com

1991 births
Living people
American male breaststroke swimmers
Arizona Wildcats men's swimmers
Sportspeople from Burlington County, New Jersey
Swimmers from New Jersey